Stephen Williams (born 6 June 1996) is a Welsh professional cyclist, who currently rides for UCI WorldTeam . He joined the team as a stagiaire in August 2018, becoming a full member of the team in 2019. He competed in the 2020 Vuelta a España.

Major results

2016
 1st Stage 1 Suir Valley 3 Day
 3rd Overall New Zealand Cycle Classic
2017
 2nd Flèche Ardennaise
2018
 1st  Overall Ronde de l'Isard
1st  Mountains classification
1st Stages 1 & 2
 4th Ronde van Zuid-Holland
 5th Overall Giro Ciclistico d'Italia
1st Stage 7
 9th Liège–Bastogne–Liège Espoirs
2021
 1st  Overall CRO Race
1st Stage 5
2022
 1st Stage 1 Tour de Suisse

Grand Tour general classification results timeline

References

External links

 

1996 births
Living people
British male cyclists
Sportspeople from Aberystwyth
Welsh male cyclists
Tour de Suisse stage winners